Andi Bajc (born 14 November 1988) is a Slovenian cyclist, who most recently rode for UCI Continental team .

Major results

2010
 4th Giro del Medio Brenta
 9th ZLM Tour
2011
 1st Stage 1 Tour of Trakya
 5th Overall Tour of Alanya
1st Stage 2
 7th Overall Tour of Gallipoli
2012
 1st Mountains classification Tour of Trakya
 2nd Mayor Cup
 6th Ljubljana–Zagreb
 7th Memorial Oleg Dyachenko
 8th Poreč Trophy
2013
 6th Central European Tour Miskolc GP
 9th Croatia–Slovenia
 9th Tour Bohemia
 10th Banja Luka–Belgrade II
2014
 3rd Visegrad 4 Bicycle Race – GP Slovakia
 6th Overall Istrian Spring Trophy
 7th Overall Oberösterreich Rundfahrt
 9th Grand Prix Südkärnten
2015
 1st Belgrade–Banja Luka II
 2nd Overall Tour de Hongrie
1st Stage 4
 2nd Raiffeisen Grand Prix
 4th Overall Oberösterreich Rundfahrt
 5th Croatia–Slovenia
2016
 5th GP Laguna
 7th Overall Istrian Spring Trophy
 8th GP Adria Mobil
2017
 6th Overall Okolo Jižních Čech
2018
 4th V4 Special Series Debrecen–Ibrány
 9th Visegrad 4 – Kerékpárverseny
2019
 5th Croatia–Slovenia
 7th GP Kranj
 8th Overall Oberösterreich Rundfahrt
 10th Poreč Trophy
2020
 5th Poreč Trophy
2021
 7th Poreč Trophy
 10th GP Adria Mobil
 10th GP Kranj

References

External links

1988 births
Living people
Slovenian male cyclists
People from Šempeter pri Gorici